Povrly  or Pömerle) is a municipality and village in Ústí nad Labem District in the Ústí nad Labem Region of the Czech Republic. It has about 2,200 inhabitants.

Administrative parts
Villages of Mírkov, Neštědice, Roztoky and Slavošov are administrative parts of Povrly.

References

Villages in Ústí nad Labem District